Pestalozzi International Foundation (formerly called Pestalozzi Children's Village Trust and then Pestalozzi International Village Trust) is an educational charitable organisation based in East Sussex, England.

Overview
The Pestalozzi Children’s Village (German: Kinderdorf Pestalozzi) was established in Trogen, Switzerland, in 1946, after the Second World War, to accommodate and educate children from both sides of the war. The concept soon spread to other countries, and in the UK the Pestalozzi Children Village was opened. The charity is named after a Swiss educationalist called Johann Heinrich Pestalozzi who believed in educating the heart, hands and head as a complete educational system. Pestalozzi Village initially offered children vocational courses to equip them with skills from agriculture to carpentry.

Until 2019, Pestalozzi International Village UK sponsored students from developing countries to study the International Baccalaureate Diploma Course programme and then A Levels at Sussex Coast College Hastings, (formerly called Hastings College of Arts and Technology) in St Leonards-on-Sea. From 2016 - 2019 students attended Claremont School in Bodiam. The charity relies on contributions from the public government bodies and individuals.

History

Pestalozzi International Foundation is an educational charity which is based in St Leonards on sea, East Sussex, England. The charity was founded in the UK in 1957 to support the Pestalozzi Swiss Village in Switzerland. The village was built on a  estate in Sedlescombe, UK and opened in 1959. 40 children between the ages of 10 and 18 from 15 European countries were accommodated and educated according to the principles of Swiss educationist called Johann Heinrich Pestalozzi. Children were educated in local schools in Hastings and St Leonards-on-Sea. In later years, the trust's focus has changed to providing educational opportunities for young people aged 16 to 19 who are academically bright but financially disadvantaged. Pestalozzi Scholars studied the International Baccalaureate at Sussex Coast College Hastings. They come from different countries, live and learn together. While in the village, scholars participated in other programmes such Pestalozzi Outreach educational programmes, gardening, Ecolab and others. In 2016, some of the Pestalozzi Scholars attended Claremont Sixth Form to study A Levels.

Educational programme
In September 2019, the scholarship programme evolved and Pestalozzi now works in partnership with United World Colleges. The Pestalozzi-UWC scholars now attend UWC Atlantic in Wales where they study the International Baccalaureate Diploma course.From 2022 students will also attend UWC Mostar.

Pestalozzi International Foundation still works with young people from the most marginalised communities of Belize, Bhutan, India, Indonesia, Nepal, Uganda, Zambia and Zimbabwe as well as Tibetans in exile in India and Nepal. In many of these countries the schools struggle to meet the needs of high-achieving, low income students. These young people are passionate about using their education to make a positive difference in society.

Patron and management
The Duke of Gloucester GCVO is the Patron of Pestalozzi International Village Trust. The Foundation is headed by a Chair of Trustees.

References

Charities based in East Sussex